Obelfing is a district of the municipality of Anzing in the Upper Bavarian district of Ebersberg.

Location
The village of Obelfing is located about half a kilometre southeast of Anzing. The settlements border each other. South of Obelfing begins the Anzing Forest, part of the Ebersberg Forest.

Ebersberg (district)